Buggy may refer to:
 Buggy (automobile)
 Buggy (surname)
 Dune buggy or beach buggy, a light, open recreational vehicle
 Horse-drawn buggy
 Kite buggy, a light, purpose-built vehicle powered by a traction kite
 Shopping buggy or shopping cart
 Buggy the Clown, an antagonist in One Piece
 Baby carriage or buggy
 Gravity racer or buggy, an unmotorised go-kart
 Buggy, a class of off-road radio-controlled cars
 Chief's buggy, a 19th-century horse-drawn fire chief's vehicle
 Buggy, a U.S. nuclear test conducted under Operation Crosstie, and Operation Plowshare

See also
 Bug (disambiguation)
 Buggie (disambiguation)
 Bugsy (disambiguation)
 Bogey (disambiguation)
 Bogy (disambiguation)
 Boogie (disambiguation)
 Bougy (disambiguation)
 Moon Buggy (disambiguation)